The Canadian ambassador to Zimbabwe is the official representative of the Canadian government to the government of Zimbabwe. The official title for the ambassador is the Ambassador Extraordinary and Plenipotentiary of Canada to the Republic of Zimbabwe. The current Canadian ambassador is Christina Buchan who was appointed on the advice of Prime Minister Justin Trudeau on November 11, 2020.

The Embassy of Canada is located at 45 Baines Avenue, Harare, Zimbabwe.

History of diplomatic relations 

Prime Minister Lester B. Pearson refused to recognize Rhodesia's unilateral declaration of independence on July 17, 1964. Diplomatic relations between Canada and Zimbabwe was established on April 17, 1980, after Rhodesia was became independent Zimbabwe. Terence Charles Bacon was appointed as Canada's first Ambassador to Zimbabwe on April 17, 1980.

List of Canadian ambassadors to Zimbabwe

See also 
 List of ambassadors and high commissioners of Canada

Notes

References 

Bibliography

External links 
 

Zimbabwe
 
Canada